NATP may refer to:

 National Agricultural Technology Project, India
 National Association of Tax Professionals, United States
 Network address and port translation
 New American Tea Party, United States